Satan's Sister is a 1925 British silent adventure film directed by George Pearson and starring Betty Balfour, Guy Phillips and Philip Stevens. It is an adaptation of the 1921 novel Satan: A Romance of the Bahamas by Henry De Vere Stacpoole. The novel was later adapted again as the 1965 film The Truth About Spring.

Cast
 Betty Balfour as Jude Tyler  
 Guy Phillips as Satan Tyler  
 Philip Stevens as Bobbie Ratcliffe  
 James Carew as Tyler  
 Frank Stanmore as Cleary  
 Caleb Porter as Carquinez  
 Frank Perfitt as Sellers  
 Jeff Barlow as Bones

References

Bibliography
 Low, Rachael. The History of the British Film 1918-1929. George Allen & Unwin, 1971.

External links

1925 films
1925 adventure films
British adventure films
British silent feature films
1920s English-language films
Films directed by George Pearson
Seafaring films
Treasure hunt films
Films based on British novels
British black-and-white films
1920s British films
Silent adventure films